Gorki is a rural locality (a settlement) in Levichanskoye Rural Settlement, Kosinsky District, Perm Krai, Russia. The population was 144 in 2010. There are six streets.

Geography 
Gorki is located 27 km southeast of Kosa (the district's administrative centre) by road. Levichi is the nearest rural locality.

References 

Rural localities in Kosinsky District